Gene R. Ward is an American politician and a Republican member of the Hawaii House of Representatives since January 2007 representing District 17.  He previously served as the Minority Leader.  He is a Vietnam veteran and former Peace Corps Country Director in East Timor. He also served with the United Nations in Malawi, Africa and was a presidential appointee in USAID in the Bush Administration.

Education
Ward earned his BA, his MA, and his PhD from the University of Hawaii at Manoa.  His dissertation was a comparative study of Hawaiians in business compared to Caucasians in business in Hawaii.

Electoral history 
1990: Ward initially won the November 6, 1990 General election.
1992: Ward was unopposed for the District 16 September 21, 2002 Republican Primary, winning with 1,508 votes, and won the November 3, 1992 general election with 6,562 votes (69.5%) against Democratic nominee Steve Boggs.
1994: Ward won the September 17, 1994 Republican Primary, and won the November 8, 1994 General election with 7,213 votes (78.7%) against Democratic nominee Mark Auerbach.
1996: Ward was unopposed for the September 21, 1996 Republican Primary, winning with 3,088 votes, and won the November 5, 1996 general election with 6,323 votes (68.3%) against Democratic nominee William Hoshijo.
1998: To challenge incumbent Democratic United States Representative Neil Abercrombie for Hawaii's 1st congressional district seat, Ward won the September 21, 1996 Republican Primary, winning with 54,844 votes (65.6%) against Quentin Kawānanakoa, but lost the November 5, 1996 general election to Abercrombie, who held the seat until 2010.
2006: When Republican Representative William Stonebreaker retired and left the District 17 seat open, Ward was unopposed for the September 26, 2006 Republican Primary, winning with 855 votes, and won the November 7, 2006 general election with 5,450 votes (55.1%) against Democratic nominee A.J. Halagao.
2008: Ward was unopposed for the September 20, 2008 Republican Primary, winning with 2,142 votes, and the November 4, 2008 general election with 6,979 votes (55.3%) against Democratic nominee Amy Monk.
2010: Ward was unopposed for both the September 18, 2010 Republican Primary, winning with 1,741 votes, and the November 2, 2010 general election.
2012: Ward was unopposed for both the August 11, 2012 Republican Primary, winning with 2,039 votes, and the November 6, 2012 General election.

References

External links
Official page at the Hawaii State Legislature
Campaign site
 

|-

|-

|-

|-

|-

1943 births
21st-century American politicians
Living people
Republican Party members of the Hawaii House of Representatives
People from Conneaut, Ohio
Politicians from Honolulu
University of Hawaiʻi at Mānoa alumni